Bannang Sata (Jawi: بنڠ ستر ) is a district (amphoe) in the southern part of Yala province, southern Thailand. It is the site of the Bang Lang Dam and reservoir.

History
The name Bannang Sata is the Thai corruption of Benang Setar (Jawi: بنڠ ستار), its original Malay name. Benang means 'sewing thread', while setar is a 'tree with small, sour fruit' (Bouea macrophylla).

In the past the district was named Ba Cho (บาเจาะ) controlled by Mueang Raman, created in 1907. The name Ba Cho is a Thai corruption of 'Bachok (Jawi: باچوق), its original Malay name. Later, the district office was moved to a new location and renamed Bannang Sata.

Geography
Neighboring districts are (from the northwest clockwise): Yaha, Krong Pinang, and Raman of Yala Province; Rueso and Si Sakhon of Narathiwat province; Than To of Yala Province; and Kedah state of Malaysia.

Administration

Central administration 
Bannang Sata is divided into six sub-districts (tambons), which are further subdivided into 50 administrative villages (mubans).

Local administration 
There are two sub-district municipalities (thesaban tambons) in the district:
 Bannang Sata consisting of parts of sub-district Bannang Sata.
 Khuean Bang Lang consisting of sub-district Khuean Bang Lang.

There are five sub-district administrative organizations (SAO) in the district:
 Bannang Sata consisting of parts of sub-district Bannang Sata.
 Bacho consisting of sub-district Bacho.
 Tano Pute consisting of sub-district Tano Pute.
 Tham Thalu consisting of sub-district Tham Thalu.
 Taling Chan consisting of sub-district Taling Chan.

References

External links
amphoe.com

Districts of Yala province